The 1991 UEFA European Under-16 Championship was the ninth edition of UEFA's European Under-16 Football Championship. Switzerland hosted the championship, during 8–18 May 1991. 16 teams entered the competition, and Spain won their third title.

Squads

Participants

Results

First stage

Group A

Group B

Group C

Group D

Semi-finals

Third place match

Final

References

RSSSF.com
UEFA.com

1991
UEFA
1990–91 in Swiss football
1991
May 1991 sports events in Europe
1991 in youth association football